Todd Armstrong Fitch (born February 15, 1964) is an American football coach and former player who is currently an offensive analyst at Ohio State. He has served as an assistant coach at various programs since the mid-1980s.

Playing career 
Fitch was born in Saline, Michigan; his family then lived in nearby Dundee but eventually moved to Bellaire, Ohio. He graduated from Bellaire High School, where he played football, and then attended Ohio Wesleyan University in Delaware, Ohio. One of his best friends at Ohio Wesleyan was Tim Corbin, then two years ahead of him and the football student-manager. Fitch and Corbin were reunited in 2020 when Fitch became an assistant at Vanderbilt; Corbin had been the head baseball coach there since 2003. He played defensive back from 1982 to 1985, lettering 1983–1985, and earning All-North Coast Athletic Conference honors in 1985.

Head coaching record

References

External links
 Vanderbilt profile

1964 births
Living people
American football defensive backs
Boston College Eagles football coaches
Bowling Green Falcons football coaches
Colorado State Rams football coaches
East Carolina Pirates football coaches
Iowa State Cyclones football coaches
Louisiana Tech Bulldogs football coaches
Ohio Wesleyan Battling Bishops football coaches
Ohio Wesleyan Battling Bishops football players
South Carolina Gamecocks football coaches
South Florida Bulls football coaches
UConn Huskies football coaches
West Virginia Mountaineers football coaches
Vanderbilt Commodores football coaches
Bowling Green State University alumni
People from Bellaire, Ohio
People from Saline, Michigan
Coaches of American football from Ohio
Players of American football from Ohio